Markus Pöttinger (born January 5, 1978) is a German former ice hockey player who last played for Iserlohn Roosters. Pöttinger has played for the national team 8 times and achieved 2nd place in the European Junior championship in 1995. As of 2007 he is working on an ice hockey related doctorate and is a member of the disciplinarian committee of the Deutsche Eishockey Liga.

External links

1978 births
Living people
German ice hockey defencemen
Sportspeople from Munich